The Ouray County Plaindealer is a weekly newspaper based in Ouray, Colorado and owned by 550 Publishing, Inc. It is the newspaper of record for the City of Ouray, Town of Ridgway and Ouray County.

History
The Plaindealer was founded as the Ouray Times, publishing its first edition June 23, 1877. It published weekly until 1886, when it was renamed the Ouray Budget and ran alternately as a weekly and a daily. In 1888, a new owner changed the name to the Ouray Plaindealer.

The Plaindealer consolidated with rival newspaper San Juan Silverite in 1892, becoming known as the Silverite Plaindealer, which published daily until 1898. It then published weekly until 1901, when it dropped the Silverite part of its name.

In 1922, the Plaindealer again consolidated, this time with another rival, the Ouray Herald, to become the Ouray Herald and Plaindealer. That name stuck until 1939, when it became simply the Ouray County Herald. Finally, in 1969, the Herald was renamed the Ouray County Plaindealer, a name that has been kept since.

Since 1980, the Ridgway Sun and Ouray County Plaindealer were published by the same publishing company. In Oct. 2010, Ouray County Newspapers sold the Sun and the Plaindealer to Alan Todd and Beecher Threatt, publishing as 550 Publishing. In 2011, the Sun was merged into the Plaindealer and is now the Ouray County Plaindealer, the official newspaper of the Town of Ridgway, the City of Ouray and Ouray County. In 2019, the Plaindealer was sold to Mike Wiggins and Erin McIntyre.

Awards
The Plaindealer is a frequent winner of Colorado Press Association awards in its class, and in 2007 Publisher David Mullings received the state’s "Service to the First" (Amendment) award. He was recognized for initiating action against the Ouray County Board of County Commissioners that resulted in an open process of selecting planning commissioners, and for enduring sharp and anonymous attacks on the newspaper and his credibility for the challenge.

In 2021, the newspaper's co-publishers Mike Wiggins and Erin McIntyre were jointly honored with the "rising star" award from the Colorado Press Association and with the "Keeper of the Flame" award from the Colorado chapter of the Society of Professional Journalists.

References

External links
Ouray County Plaindealer website

Newspapers published in Colorado
Publications established in 1877
1877 establishments in Colorado